NGC 7077 is a lenticular blue compact dwarf galaxy located about 56 million light-years away from Earth in the constellation Aquarius. Discovered by astronomer Albert Marth on August 11, 1863, the galaxy lies within the Local Void.

See also 
 List of NGC objects (7001–7840)

References

External links 

Peculiar galaxies
Lenticular galaxies
Aquarius (constellation)
7077
11755
66860
Astronomical objects discovered in 1863